Pixelus is a puzzle video game released for the Microsoft Windows and Mac OS X in 2005.  A deluxe version was released later in the year. The story follows a young Greek man named Claudius who is shipwrecked and rebuilds temple mosaics in order to gain the favor of the gods. The gameplay of Pixelus is a clone of the Japanese 2001 game Guru Logi Champ published for the Game Boy Advance.

Gameplay 
The objective of Pixelus is to create specific images on a 16x16 grid using a limited number of tiles. Players must slide tiles across the grid and land them in specific locations to form an image.  Areas where tiles must be placed are often not immediately accessible. For this reason, tiles must often be used to block other tiles, then removed and placed in other locations. During gameplay, players may choose to reset the puzzle, go back one move, and receive a hint. On completing a puzzle, players can receive gold, silver, or bronze medals based on how few moves they used.

References

2004 video games
MacOS games
PopCap games
Puzzle video games
Windows games
Xbox games
Video game clones
Video games developed in Belgium
Video games developed in the United States

IPod games
Palm OS games
Single-player video games
Video games set in antiquity
J2ME games